For information on all United States Military Academy sports, see Army Black Knights

The Army Black Knights baseball team is a varsity intercollegiate athletic team of the United States Military Academy in West Point, New York, United States. The team is a member of the Patriot League, which is part of the National Collegiate Athletic Association's Division I. Army's first baseball team was fielded in 1890. The team plays its home games at Johnson Stadium at Doubleday Field in West Point, New York. The Black Knights are coached by Chris Tracz.

Major League Baseball
Army has had 20 Major League Baseball Draft selections since the draft began in 1965.

On August 12, 2017, Chris Rowley (2010–13) became the first West Point Graduate to play in the Major Leagues, pitching 5.2 innings and allowing 1 run against the Pittsburgh Pirates, earning the win.

Games versus professional baseball teams

Records

See also
List of NCAA Division I baseball programs

References

External links
 

 
Baseball teams established in 1890
1890 establishments in New York (state)